Tretoquinol is a beta-adrenergic agonist.

References 

Tetrahydroisoquinolines
Catechols
Pyrogallol ethers